The Wilma Theater is a non-profit theater company located at 265 S. Broad Street at the corner of Spruce Street in the Avenue of the Arts area of Center City, Philadelphia. The company's current 296-seat theater opened in 1996 and was designed by Hugh Hardy.

History
The Wilma Theater began in 1973 as the "Wilma Project", founded to produce original material and to develop community-orient artists. The name "Wilma" refers to an imaginary oppressed sister of Shakespeare created by Virginia Woolf. 

Blanka Zizka and Jiri Zizka from Czechoslovakia joined the project in 1979 as artists-in-residence, and later took over artistic leadership, changing the name to the Wilma Theater. The company staged their productions at a variety of different theaters, in particular a 100-seat converted garage on Sansom Street, but opened their current 296-seat theater on S. Broad Street in 1996.

Jiri Zizka left the theater at the end of the 2009–2010 season and died in January 2012.

Productions by the Wilma have been seen at the International Theater Festival in the Czech Republic; in New York City at the Public Theater and Manhattan Theatre Club; the Kennedy Center for the Performing Arts in Washington, DC; the McCarter Theatre in Princeton, New Jersey; the Long Wharf Theatre in New Haven, Connecticut; and ACT in Seattle. In addition to their presentations and festivals, the Wilma has produced over 100 productions, including 18 world premieres, 13 United States premieres, five East Coast premieres, and 64 Philadelphia premieres. The Wilma also co-produced a feature film broadcast nationally on Great Performances.

The Wilma has worked with notable artists such as Stephen Sondheim, Tom Stoppard, Christopher Hampton, Doug Wright, Arthur Miller, and Paula Vogel, and produced works by up-and-coming playwrights such as Claudia Shear, Lillian Groag, Chay Yew, Charles L. Mee, Dan O'Brien, Jason Sherman, Dael Orlandersmith, Robert William Sherwood, Sarah Ruhl, Polly Pen, Laurence Klavan, and James Ijames.

Awards and honors
, the theater had won 68 Barrymore Awards for Excellence in Theatre and received 238 nominations.

References 
Notes

External links 

1973 establishments in Pennsylvania
Arts organizations established in 1973
Center City, Philadelphia
Theatre companies in Philadelphia
Theatres completed in 1996
Theatres in Philadelphia